Stephen Webb is the name of:
Stephen H. Webb (1961–2016), American theologian
Stephen P. Webb (born 1946), former Mayor of Beverly Hills, California
Stephen Palfrey Webb (1804–1879), sixth Mayor of San Francisco, California; third and twelfth Mayor of Salem, Massachusetts
Stephen A. Webb (born 1956), British academic and researcher
Steve Webb (ice hockey) (born 1975), National Hockey League player

See also
Steven Webb (born 1984), British actor
Steve Webb (disambiguation)